Datuk Haji Abdul Rahim bin Bakri (Jawi: عبدالرحيم بن بكري; born 11 April 1961) is a Malaysian politician who served as the Deputy Minister of Finance I in the Perikatan Nasional (PN) administration under former Prime Minister Muhyiddin Yassin and former Minister Tengku Zafrul Aziz from March 2020 to August 2021, Deputy Minister of Defence, Deputy Minister of Transport, Deputy Minister of Foreign Affairs in the Barisan Nasional (BN) administration under former Prime Ministers Abdullah Ahmad Badawi and Najib Razak and former Ministers Rais Yatim, Ong Tee Keat, Kong Cho Ha and Hishammuddin Hussein from March 2008 to May 2013 and Member of Parliament (MP) for Kudat from March 2008 to November 2022. He is a member of the Malaysian United Indigenous Party (BERSATU), a component party of the PN coalition was a member of the United Malays National Organisation (UMNO), a component party of the BN coalition. After the defeat of BN to PH in the 2018 general election, he resigned from UMNO in 2018 and joined BERSATU in 2019.  was a member of the United Malays National Organisation (UMNO), a component party of the BN coalition. After the defeat of BN to PH in the 2018 general election, he resigned from UMNO to be an independent in 2018 and joined BERSATU in 2019. 

Abdul Rahim was elected to federal Parliament in the 2004 general election. Since 2008 he had been a deputy minister in the former ruling Barisan Nasional (BN) government till 2018. In April 2008, he was appointed as Deputy Minister of Foreign Affairs, and was appointed Deputy Minister of Transport in April 2009. He was again moved, this time being appointed as the Deputy Minister of Defence, after the 2013 election.

Election results

Honours
  :
  Companion Class I of the Exalted Order of Malacca (DMSM) - Datuk (2002)

See also

 Kudat (federal constituency)

References 

Living people
1961 births
People from Sabah
Malaysian Muslims
Malaysian United Indigenous Party politicians
Former United Malays National Organisation politicians
Independent politicians in Malaysia
Members of the Dewan Rakyat
Presidents of the Malaysian Friendship and Trade Centre
21st-century Malaysian politicians